André Loyola Stein  (born 19 August 1994) is a Brazilian beach volleyball player. He plays as a blocker.

He won a gold medal at the 2017 Beach Volleyball World Championships along with Evandro Oliveira, becoming the youngest player to do so.

References

1994 births
Living people
Brazilian men's beach volleyball players
People from Vila Velha
Beach volleyball defenders
Sportspeople from Espírito Santo
21st-century Brazilian people